Addisu Legesse is an Ethiopian politician who  served as Deputy Prime Minister of Ethiopia. He was formerly the chairman of the Amhara Democratic Party (ADP), the Amhara region branch of the ruling EPRDF, a position from which he retired in 2010. He was also President of the Amhara region from 1992 until 2000, deputy prime Minister, and Minister of Agriculture and Rural Development until 2008. He then served as chairman of Ethiopian Airlines. He is currently head of the Meles Zenawi Academy, a quasi educational institution that is designed to train future EPRDF cadres in the ideology of Melesism, also known as, Ethiopian style Revolutionary Democracy

References

Year of birth missing (living people)
Living people
Presidents of Amhara Region
Deputy Prime Ministers of Ethiopia
Government ministers of Ethiopia
Amhara Democratic Party politicians
20th-century Ethiopian politicians
21st-century Ethiopian politicians
Agriculture ministers